Marielle Nordmann (born 24 January 1941 in Montpellier) is a French classical harpist.

Biography 
Marielle Nordmann was a pupil of Lily Laskine at the Conservatoire de Paris where she won a first prize in 1958. Between 1960 and 1978, she led the Nordmann Trio with flautist André Guilbert and cellist Renaud Fontanarosa.

An international soloist, Marielle Nordmann divides her time between concerts, teaching and artistic creation. She gives concerts around the world (New York, Tokyo, Moscow, Buenos Aires, São Paulo, Bangkok ...), creating shows where she likes to cross the arts (mime, dance, comedy).

She gives master classes for children, organizes competitions in France and abroad, and created a foundation helping young musicians. She taught in Argentina between 1989 and 1999.

She co-founded the Lili Laskine competition in 1993 and the "Journées de la harpe" at Arles in 1995.

1CD: Harp concertos by Boieldieu, Parish Alvars and Viotti with Jean Pierre Rampal and the Franz Liszt chamber orchestra.

Marielle Nordman is the author of the book Lily Laskine, Éditions Cahiers du Temps, 1999

References

External links 
 Official site
 Marielle Nordmann on France Musiques
 Rencontre avec la harpiste Marielle Nordmann on France Inter (audio)
 Interview with Marielle Nordman on concertclassic.com
 Marielle Nordman on Babelio
 Marielle Nordman on aiharpe.org
 Marielle Nordmann and Nemanja Radulovic - Fantaisie pour violon et harpe by C.Saint Saëns on YouTube 

French classical harpists
Conservatoire de Paris alumni
Chevaliers of the Ordre des Arts et des Lettres
Chevaliers of the Légion d'honneur
1941 births
Musicians from Montpellier
Living people